is a Japanese manga series written by Tatsuya Matsuki and illustrated by Shiro Usazaki. It was serialized in Shueisha's Weekly Shōnen Jump from January 2018 to August 2020, with its chapters collected into 12 tankōbon volumes. Act-Age was canceled and removed from the magazine and all official platforms after Matsuki's arrest in August 2020.

Viz Media published the first three chapters for its "Jump Start" initiative and then the series was simultaneously published from December 2018, after a restructuring of the English Shonen Jump. Shueisha also published the series in English and Spanish on their Manga Plus platform from January 2019 to August 2020.

Plot
The story focuses on Kei Yonagi, a high school girl who strives to become an actress. She lives with her two younger siblings, after their father left them and their mother died. Kei has an extreme talent for method acting, to the point where she loses track of reality while acting. At an audition, some speculate that acting of this intensity could be self-destructive, and cite that as a reason for not accepting her. However, Kei catches the eye of the highly acclaimed director Sumiji Kuroyama, who steps forward with the intent of bringing out her full potential.

Characters

A high school girl who finds herself raising her younger siblings, Rui and Rei, on her own, after their father left them and their mother died. She has an innate talent for method acting, in which she uses memories from her own past to fully get into the role. However, her approach is extremely immersive, to the point where she gets lost in the role and becomes unable to distinguish fiction and reality.

Director and the founder of Studio Daikokuten. He is famous overseas for his awards in various film festivals, but he is not as well known in Japan.

Assistant director and filmmaker at Studio Daikokuten who works with Kuroyama. She is also a production manager and a talent manager for the studio.

Nicknamed "the Angel", a famous actor from the Stars Agency.

Founder and CEO of the Stars Agency.

Actor from the Stars Agency and the son of Arisa Hoshi.

A skilled stage play actor.

Media

Manga
It was serialized in Shueisha's shōnen manga magazine Weekly Shōnen Jump from January 22, 2018, to August 11, 2020. Shueisha collected the chapters into twelve individual tankōbon volumes, released from May 2, 2018, to July 3, 2020.

On August 8, 2020, it was reported that Matsuki was arrested for allegedly approaching and inappropriately touching two female middle school students in June of the same year. Editors from Weekly Shōnen Jump stated that they would be taking the matter seriously. It was later announced that the series would immediately end publication, with the chapter released on August 11, 2020 being the last. On August 17, 2020, it was announced that Shueisha has suspended all sales of the manga. It was also announced that volume 13 and further volumes have been canceled. On August 24, 2020, Shiro Usazaki issued a statement expressing sympathies for the victims and did not want the manga to be a work that triggers similar reactions from the victims, considering the cancellation to be appropriate. Despite regrets of having to end the manga mid-way, Usazaki urged fans of the series not to harass or blame the victims. On September 16, 2020, Matsuki was formally indicted for the second of the two indecent acts committed. Matsuki's sentencing was held on December 23, 2020. The Tokyo District Court handed Matsuki a guilty verdict and a sentence of one year and six months in prison suspended for three years (Matsuki will not serve his sentence if he remains on good behavior for three years).

Viz Media published the first three chapters for its "Jump Start" initiative and then began to simulpublish the series in December 2018 after a restructuring of the English Shonen Jump. Shueisha also simulpublished in English the series on the app and website Manga Plus starting in January 2019. Following Matsuki's arrest in August 2020, Viz Media and Manga Plus decided to not publish the series' final chapter on their platforms. In October 2019, Viz Media announced the print release of the manga in summer 2020. The first two volumes were released on July 7 and September 1, 2020, respectively. Following Matsuki's arrest, Viz Media removed its listing of further volumes.

Volume list

Chapters not released in tankōbon format
These chapters were not published in a tankōbon volume. They were originally serialized in Japanese in issues of Weekly Shōnen Jump from April to August 2020.

Canceled stage play
In June 2020, it was announced the manga would receive a stage play adaptation in 2022 titled . The play would be produced by Horipro, and directed and written by Shū Matsui. A "remote audition" for the role of the protagonist Kei Yonagi would have been held across Japan. On August 11, 2020, after Tatsuya Matsuki's arrest and the manga cancellation, Horipro announced the cancellation of the stage play.

Reception
As of February 2019, the first five volumes of the manga had 750,000 copies in circulation. As of June 2020, the first eleven volumes of the manga had over 3 million copies in circulation. Volume 5 of the manga ranked 13th on Oricon's weekly manga rankings chart, with 52,319 copies sold.

The series ranked 3rd on the "Nationwide Bookstore Employees' Recommended Comics of 2018". In April 2019, it was nominated for Best Shōnen Manga at the 43nd annual Kodansha Manga Awards. In December 2019, Brutus magazine listed Act-Age on their "Most Dangerous Manga" list, which included works with the most "stimulating" and thought-provoking themes. The series ranked #6 in a 2020 poll conducted by AnimeJapan of "Most Wanted Anime Adaptation".

Notes

References

Further reading

External links
 Act-Age on Weekly Shōnen Jump website 
 Act-Age on Manga Plus
 Act-Age on the Official Viz website
 

Drama anime and manga
Shōnen manga
Shueisha manga
Theatre in anime and manga
Unfinished comics
Viz Media manga